James Geoffrey Ian Norton (born 18 July 1985) is an English film, television, and stage actor. He is known for roles in the television series Happy Valley, Grantchester, War & Peace and McMafia. He earned a nomination for the British Academy Television Award for Best Supporting Actor in 2015 for his performance as ex-convict Tommy Lee Royce in Happy Valley.

Early life
Norton was born in Lambeth, London,<ref name=BMD>'Births, Marriages & Deaths Index of England & Wales confirms name and birthdate and lists birthplace as Lambeth. Publisher: General Register Office. Retrieved: 30 April 2021.</ref> the son of Lavinia Jane (Norman) and Hugh Biddulph Norton. His parents were both teachers; his father, who was born in Tanzania, was a lecturer at Hull School of Art and Design. Though originally from London, Norton's family lived in the town of Malton in the Ryedale district of North Yorkshire. Norton, who grew up at the edge of the Howardian Hills in North Yorkshire, has described his childhood as "idyllic". Norton's ancestry is English, Irish, Scottish, German, and Jewish. Hugh Norton's father, Ian Norton, MBE (1923–2003), a colonial official (including district officer) in Tanganyika, was son of Hugh Ross Norton, OBE, Archdeacon of Sudbury from 1945 to 1962; Ian's wife, Jean (1923–2016), was daughter of Colonel Francis John Biddulph, of the Royal Engineers. The Biddulphs were a branch of an Irish landed gentry family.

Education
Norton was educated at Bramcote Prep School (Scarborough College) in Scarborough until the age of 13 and Ampleforth College, an independent Roman Catholic (Benedictine) boarding school in the village of Ampleforth in North Yorkshire. He did work experience at the Stephen Joseph Theatre in Scarborough when he was 15.

Starting in 2004, Norton read theology at Fitzwilliam College, Cambridge, graduating in 2007 with First Class Honours. Norton received a Fitzwilliam Travel Grant to travel to Northern India, to teach and perform for schoolchildren at 16 schools. He has said his studies were principally focused on Hinduism and Buddhism.

Norton was a member of The Marlowe Society theatre club at Cambridge and, in 2007, he played Posthumus in a production of Cymbeline directed by Trevor Nunn for the society's centenary. Norton has said that he performed in many theatre productions while at university. Norton then attended the Royal Academy of Dramatic Art (RADA) in London for three years, but left in 2010 six months before graduation to take an acting assignment.

Career
Norton appeared as a classmate of Jenn in the film An Education, starring Carey Mulligan, in 2009. In 2010, he was an original cast member of Posh at the Royal Court Theatre. At the Crucible Theatre in Sheffield in 2010, Norton starred in That Face as Henry, an 18-year-old who has dropped out of school to care for his mentally disturbed and drug-dependent mother, played by Frances Barber. Lynne Walker of The Independent wrote of his performance: "At the centre of it all is Henry who, in James Norton's striking portrayal, is like a young caged animal". In 2011, Norton starred as Captain Stanhope in the First World War drama Journey's End. The production toured the UK from March to June and transferred to the Duke of York's Theatre in the West End from July to September. Norton then took the role of Geoffrey in The Lion in Winter at the Theatre Royal, Haymarket directed by Trevor Nunn, with whom Norton had worked at Cambridge in Cymbeline.

In the 2012 film Cheerful Weather for the Wedding, Norton played Owen, the would-be groom of a conflicted bride. He appeared in the 2013 film Rush as Formula One driver Guy Edwards. In the 2013 film Belle, he played a suitor of the title character, a mixed-race woman in 18th century English society. Norton's television appearances include the Doctor Who episode "Cold War", in which he played a crewman on a Soviet submarine during the Cold War, and Death Comes to Pemberley, based on the P. D. James novel involving characters from Jane Austen's Pride and Prejudice caught up in a murder mystery. Norton was acclaimed for his role as Tommy Lee Royce, the villain of the hit crime drama Happy Valley. Michael Hogan of The Telegraph wrote: "...the breakout star, seen in only a few small parts before this, has been the devilishly handsome James Norton, 29, as the heinous killer Royce, whom he has played with impressive depth". As the first series came to its dramatic conclusion, Norton commented, "8 million people are currently wishing me dead". Norton confirmed he would be appearing in the second series of Happy Valley at the 2015 BAFTAs and continued in the role in the third series.

From 2014 to 2018, Norton played crime-solving vicar Sidney Chambers alongside Robson Green as Police Inspector Geordie Keating in the ITV series Grantchester, based on the novels by James Runcie. Grantchester was his first starring role. A second series was broadcast in early 2016. A third series went into production in autumn 2016, and aired in both the UK and the U.S. in late spring and early summer 2017. A fourth series began filming in June 2018, and it was confirmed that this would be Norton's final series.

He also appears in the 2014 films Northmen: A Viking Saga and Mr. Turner, a biographical drama on the life of the artist J. M. W. Turner by director Mike Leigh. In 2015 Norton played Duncan Grant in the BBC Two mini-series about the Bloomsbury Group, Life in Squares. In 2016, Norton appeared as Prince Andrei Bolkonsky in the BBC miniseries of Andrew Davies' production of War & Peace. The mini-series, a co-production with The Weinstein Company, allowed the cast to film in Russia.

Between March and May 2016, Norton appeared in Tracy Letts’ Bug in London's West End. In 2016, he appeared in "Nosedive", an episode of the anthology series Black Mirror. Between December 2017 and February 2018 he appeared in Amy Herzog’s Belleville at the Donmar Warehouse Theatre. As part of his preparation for his role in McMafia, Norton studied the Russian martial art and health system Systema. In 2019, Norton portrayed John Brooke in Greta Gerwig's film adaptation of Louisa May Alcott's novel Little Women.

Personal life
When asked if he was religious, in the context of portraying a vicar in Grantchester'', Norton said, "Obviously I have a relationship with religion, because I went to a Catholic school and studied theology. I can't call myself religious, but I'm definitely fascinated by it".

In 2015, Norton was made a trustee of the Royal Theatrical Support Trust. Norton has type 1 diabetes.

He was in a relationship with actress Jessie Buckley between 2015 and 2017. Norton has been in a relationship with actress Imogen Poots since 2018. They have been engaged since 2022.

Filmography

Film

Television

Video games

Theatre

Awards and nominations

References

External links
 

1985 births
Living people
Alumni of Fitzwilliam College, Cambridge
Alumni of RADA
English male actors
English male film actors
English male stage actors
English male television actors
Male actors from London
Male actors from Yorkshire
People educated at Ampleforth College
People from Lambeth
People from Malton, North Yorkshire
People with type 1 diabetes
21st-century English male actors